Big Foot Museum is a museum and a theme park based in the South Goa, India, village of Loutolim in the sub-district (or taluka) of Salcete. It is a museum dedicated to rural Goan life. It was founded and is run by the artist Maendra Alvares. Loutolim is close to Margao.

Themes, rural life
This privately run venture recreates a Goan village in miniature that seeks to depict what the local rural life was in the past, over a century ago. The museum is located in an open-air setting.

Depictions
The Ancestral Goa museum -- with statues of a Portuguese soldier brandishing a spear, a statue of Lord Parashuram, a fisherman, and other villagers, women selling fish, farmers working in paddy fields and other occupations of the past -- has been described in The Indian Express as nearby "the Casa Alvares mansion that belonged to the Portuguese lawyer Araujo Alvares. It is peppered with antiques, paintings and period furniture...  typical shell windows, the high ceiling and the heavy carved wooden furniture. The dining room could seat at least 30."

Location, etc
Margao is 9 km from Loutolim. It can be reached by public bus, car, taxi or even the two-wheeler motorcycle taxis that Goa is known for.

It has on its campus an art gallery, a handicraft centre offering Goan crafts on sale, a restaurant, cross, spring, rubber plantations, and a spice yard. 'Houses' in the campus recreate traditional Goan village occupations. These depict local artisans, a music school, the village market, liquor shops, and a local alcohol (feni) distillery.

Origin of its name
Its name come from what has been narrated as The Legend of the Big Foot.

Recognition
It has been listed in The Goa You Don’t Know: 10 Offbeat Travel Secrets That Go Beyond Beaches. Big Foot has been listed among the "five awesome museums in Goa".

The World-Famous Left-Hander Museum is also on its campus.

Updates
In June 2020, this museum, together with others in Goa, was reported as having its operations being hard by the COVID-19 pandemic.

References

External links

Video on Big Foot Museum
Big Foot website

Museums in Goa
Year of establishment missing